Oulu sub-region is a subdivision of Northern Ostrobothnia and one of the Sub-regions of Finland since 2009.

Municipalities

 Hailuoto
 Kempele
 Liminka
 Lumijoki
 Muhos
 Oulu
 Tyrnävä

Politics
Results of the 2018 Finnish presidential election:

 Sauli Niinistö   57.4%
 Pekka Haavisto   12.4%
 Paavo Väyrynen   9.4%
 Matti Vanhanen   6.9%
 Laura Huhtasaari   6.8%
 Merja Kyllönen   4.5%
 Tuula Haatainen   2.1%
 Nils Torvalds   0.6%

Sub-regions of Finland
Geography of North Ostrobothnia